The Darien harvest mouse (Reithrodontomys darienensis) is a species of rodent in the family Cricetidae.
It is found only in Panama.

References

Musser, G. G. and M. D. Carleton. 2005. Superfamily Muroidea. pp. 894–1531 in Mammal Species of the World a Taxonomic and Geographic Reference. D. E. Wilson and D. M. Reeder eds. Johns Hopkins University Press, Baltimore.

Reithrodontomys
Mammals described in 1939
Taxa named by Oliver Payne Pearson
Taxonomy articles created by Polbot